The 2006 Syracuse Orange football team represented Syracuse University during the 2006 NCAA Division I FBS football season. The Orange were coached by Greg Robinson and played their home games at the Carrier Dome in Syracuse, New York.

In 2015, Syracuse vacated the four wins from this season among others from the 2004 to 2006 season, due to the NCAA finding players ineligible for academic fraud.

Schedule

References

Syracuse
Syracuse Orange football seasons
Syracuse Orange football